Marjan Tomašić (born 6 December 1986) is a Croatian footballer who plays as a goalkeeper.

Career
Tomašić was born in Rijeka. He has formerly played for KF Skënderbeu Korçë in the Albanian Superliga and in his homeland in Croatia for HNK Rijeka, HNK Orijent 1919, NK Novalja and NK Pomorac.

References

1986 births
Living people
Footballers from Rijeka
Association football goalkeepers
Croatian footballers
HNK Rijeka players
HNK Orijent players
NK Novalja players
NK Pomorac 1921 players
KF Skënderbeu Korçë players
Second Football League (Croatia) players
First Football League (Croatia) players
Kategoria Superiore players
Croatian expatriate footballers
Expatriate footballers in Albania
Croatian expatriate sportspeople in Albania